Statistics of Football League First Division in the 1974–75 season.

Overview
Derby County won the First Division title for the second time in the club's history that season. They made sure of it on 19 April, with a 0-0 draw at Leicester City and the fact that their title challengers Liverpool lost 1-0 at Middlesbrough. Carlisle United were relegated on 19 April, despite winning 1-0 at home against Wolverhampton Wanderers, Tottenham Hotspur sent the Cumbrians down. Chelsea were relegated after they only drew 1-1 at home against Everton where they had to better Luton Town's result but Luton also drew 1-1 at home, against Manchester City. Luton Town went down on 28 April, after Tottenham beat Leeds United 4-2 at White Hart Lane.

League standings

Results

Managerial changes

Team locations

Top scorers

References

RSSSF

Football League First Division seasons
Eng
1974–75 Football League
1974–75 in English football leagues

lt:Anglijos futbolo varžybos 1974–1975 m.
hu:1974–1975-es angol labdarúgó-bajnokság (első osztály)
ru:Футбольная лига Англии 1974-1975